The following is a list of all IFT-licensed over-the-air television stations broadcasting in the Mexican state of Durango. There are 21 television stations in Durango.

List of television stations

|-

|-

|-

|-

|-

|-

|-

|-

|-

|-

|-

|-

|-

|-

|-

|-

|-

|-

|-

See also
Television stations in Coahuila for most stations in the Comarca Lagunera

References

Television stations in Durango
Dura